Coleophora maturella is a moth of the family Coleophoridae. It is found in Russia.

The larvae feed on the needles of Larix sibirica.

References

maturella
Moths described in 1982
Moths of Asia